Senator Day may refer to:

Albert R. Day (1861–?), Maine State Senate
Ann Day (1938–2016), Arizona State Senate
Arthur H. Day (1890–1967), Ohio State Senate
Charles W. Day (1836–1906), Wisconsin State Senate
Clint Day (fl. 1990s), Georgia State Senate
Dick Day (born 1937), Minnesota State Senate
Frank A. Day (1855–1928), Minnesota State Senate
L. B. Day (1932–1986), Oregon State Senate
Luther Day (1813–1885), Ohio State Senate
Theodore D. Day (1917–2003), New York State Senate
Rita Heard Days (born 1950), Missouri State Senate